The Puerto Rican barn owl (Tyto cavatica) is an extinct species of barn owl that inhabited the island of Puerto Rico in the Caribbean. It is sometimes considered to be a subspecies of the ashy-faced owl (Tyto glaucops).

References

Puerto Rican barn owl
Extinct birds of the Caribbean
†
Bird extinctions since 1500
Puerto Rican barn owl
Taxa named by Alexander Wetmore